Paal-Helge Haugen (born 26 April 1945) is a Norwegian poet, novelist, dramatist and children's writer who has published over 30 books. His titles have been translated into at least 20 languages. His 1968 "punktroman" or "pointillist novel," Anne, was the first in its genre and was soon considered a modern classic. In 2019, Hanging Loose Press published the first English translation of  Anne], after Julia Johanne Tolo's translation of the book won the sixth annual Loose Translations Prize, jointly sponsored by Hanging Loose Press and the graduate writing program of Queens College, City University of New York.

Career
Haugen was born in Valle, Setesdal, and studied medicine at the University of Oslo. During the period 1965-67, Haugen was a member of the editorial team of literary magazine Profile. He made his literary debut with Blad frå ein austleg hage in 1965, a translation of Japanese haiku. It was shortly followed by På botnen av ein mørk sommar  in 1967, an adaptations of Chinese poems and his first collection of original poetry. Studies in film and literature took him to the United States in 1971.  From 1973-1978 he taught creative writing in Norway. Since then Haugen has worked as a freelance writer.

Haugen has published eighteen volumes of poetry, including two volumes of selected poems and one of collected poems since 1967. His works have been translated into a 20th-century language. He has collaborated with numerous artists (Kjell Nupen, Grete Nash, Olaf Chr. Jensen, Jens Johannesen, Jan Groth, and others) and both Norwegian and international composers (Iannis Xenakis, Atli Heimir Sveinsson, Kjell Habbestad, Bjørn Kruse, Arne Nordheim, Lillebjørn Nilsen and others). He has been chairman of the Norwegian National Film Selection (1980–85), chairman of the Norwegian Authors Association Literary Council and deputy chairman of the Norwegian Playwrights' Association.

Det overvintra lyset, first published in 1985, won both the Gyldendal's Endowment and the Nynorsk Literature Prize for the year’s best book written in Nynorsk. He received the Dobloug Prize in 1987, and was awarded the Norwegian Critics Prize for Literature in 1990. He received the Brage Prize in 1994 for Sone 0. Haugen was nominated for the Nordic Council's Literature Prize in 1991 for Meditasjonar over Georges de La Tour.

In January 2009 King Harald V of Norway made Haugen a Knight, First Class of the Royal Norwegian Order of St. Olav, awarding him for his work for Norwegian literature and culture.

Awards
Gyldendal's Endowment 1985
Nynorsk Literature Prize 1985
Dobloug Prize 1987
Norwegian Critics Prize for Literature 1990
Cappelen Prize 1991
Brage Prize 1992
Aschehoug Prize 2008
Royal Norwegian Order of St. Olav 2009

References

1945 births
Living people
People from Valle, Norway
Nynorsk-language writers
Norwegian children's writers
Norwegian Critics Prize for Literature winners
20th-century Norwegian poets
Norwegian male poets
20th-century Norwegian novelists
21st-century Norwegian novelists
University of Oslo alumni
Dobloug Prize winners
Norwegian male novelists
20th-century Norwegian male writers
21st-century Norwegian male writers